Bentse Brug is a former industrial installation in Oslo, Norway, near the river Akerselva. At the site was originally a corn mill, and from 1696 the first paper mill in Norway started its operation. In 1838 Norway's first paper machine was installed, delivered from England. Benste Brug went bankrupt in 1899, and was later taken over by Myrens Verksted.

References 

Pulp and paper companies of Norway
Defunct companies of Norway
Companies based in Oslo
1696 establishments in Norway
Akerselva